The 7th Parliament of Upper Canada was opened 4 February 1817.  Elections in Upper Canada had been held in July 1816.  All sessions were held at York, Upper Canada at the home of Chief Justice of the Court William Henry Draper.  This parliament was dissolved 3 May 1820 on the announcement of the death of King George III.

The House of Assembly of the 7th Parliament of Upper Canada had five sessions 4 February 1817 to 7 March 1820:

See also
Legislative Council of Upper Canada
Executive Council of Upper Canada
Legislative Assembly of Upper Canada
Lieutenant Governors of Upper Canada, 1791-1841
Historical federal electoral districts of Canada
List of Ontario provincial electoral districts

References

Further reading 
Handbook of Upper Canadian Chronology, Frederick H. Armstrong, Toronto : Dundurn Press, 1985. 

07
1817 establishments in Upper Canada
1820 disestablishments in Upper Canada